The Definitive Collection is a 2008 compilation album by The Supremes. It charted at #142 on the Billboard 200.

Track listings
"Where Did Our Love Go" - 2:33
"Baby Love" - 2:36
"Come See About Me" - 2:40
"Stop! In the Name of Love" - 2:52
"Back in My Arms Again" - 2:54
"Nothing but Heartaches" - 2:57
"I Hear a Symphony" - 2:39
"My World Is Empty Without You" - 2:33
"Love Is Like an Itching in My Heart" - 2:56
"You Can't Hurry Love" - 2:46
"You Keep Me Hangin' On" - 2:41
"Love Is Here and Now You're Gone" - 2:47
"The Happening" - 2:51
"Reflections" - 2:51
"Love Child" - 2:55
"I'm Livin' in Shame" - 3:00
"I'm Gonna Make You Love Me" (with The Temptations) - 3:08
"Someday We'll Be Together" - 3:32

References

2008 compilation albums
The Supremes compilation albums
Motown compilation albums